The Mineralnye Vody constituency (No.67) is a Russian legislative constituency in Stavropol Krai. The constituency covers the entirety of Caucasian Mineral Waters resort in southern Stavropol Krai.

Members elected

Election results

1993

|-
! colspan=2 style="background-color:#E9E9E9;text-align:left;vertical-align:top;" |Candidate
! style="background-color:#E9E9E9;text-align:left;vertical-align:top;" |Party
! style="background-color:#E9E9E9;text-align:right;" |Votes
! style="background-color:#E9E9E9;text-align:right;" |%
|-
|style="background-color:"|
|align=left|Vladimir Katrenko
|align=left|Independent
|
|19.81%
|-
|style="background-color:"|
|align=left|Roman Gavrilov
|align=left|Independent
| -
|15.60%
|-
| colspan="5" style="background-color:#E9E9E9;"|
|- style="font-weight:bold"
| colspan="3" style="text-align:left;" | Total
| 
| 100%
|-
| colspan="5" style="background-color:#E9E9E9;"|
|- style="font-weight:bold"
| colspan="4" |Source:
|
|}

1995

|-
! colspan=2 style="background-color:#E9E9E9;text-align:left;vertical-align:top;" |Candidate
! style="background-color:#E9E9E9;text-align:left;vertical-align:top;" |Party
! style="background-color:#E9E9E9;text-align:right;" |Votes
! style="background-color:#E9E9E9;text-align:right;" |%
|-
|style="background-color:#1A1A1A"|
|align=left|Stanislav Govorukhin
|align=left|Stanislav Govorukhin Bloc
|
|23.41%
|-
|style="background-color:"|
|align=left|Svetlana Umnyakova
|align=left|Communist Party
|
|16.53%
|-
|style="background-color:"|
|align=left|Aleksandr Kashcheyev
|align=left|Independent
|
|15.70%
|-
|style="background-color:#1C1A0D"|
|align=left|Roman Gavrilov
|align=left|Forward, Russia!
|
|10.64%
|-
|style="background-color:"|
|align=left|Yury Churekov
|align=left|Independent
|
|6.96%
|-
|style="background-color:"|
|align=left|Vladimir Gevorkov
|align=left|Independent
|
|3.56%
|-
|style="background-color:"|
|align=left|Viktor Kaznacheyev
|align=left|Independent
|
|2.45%
|-
|style="background-color:"|
|align=left|Aleksandr Porublev
|align=left|Independent
|
|2.34%
|-
|style="background-color:"|
|align=left|Mikhail Snezhkov
|align=left|Liberal Democratic Party
|
|2.24%
|-
|style="background-color:#F21A29"|
|align=left|Aleksey Popov
|align=left|Trade Unions and Industrialists – Union of Labour
|
|1.94%
|-
|style="background-color:"|
|align=left|Vladimir Polyakov
|align=left|Independent
|
|1.37%
|-
|style="background-color:#DA2021"|
|align=left|Sergey Prokopov
|align=left|Ivan Rybkin Bloc
|
|1.28%
|-
|style="background-color:"|
|align=left|Yury Karakhanov
|align=left|Independent
|
|0.94%
|-
|style="background-color:"|
|align=left|Vasily Tovkan
|align=left|Independent
|
|0.86%
|-
|style="background-color:"|
|align=left|Vyacheslav Yegorov
|align=left|Independent
|
|0.76%
|-
|style="background-color:"|
|align=left|Vladimir Trufanov
|align=left|Independent
|
|0.69%
|-
|style="background-color:"|
|align=left|Vladimir Adelkhanov
|align=left|Russian Party of Automobile Owners
|
|0.63%
|-
|style="background-color:#000000"|
|colspan=2 |against all
|
|5.38%
|-
| colspan="5" style="background-color:#E9E9E9;"|
|- style="font-weight:bold"
| colspan="3" style="text-align:left;" | Total
| 
| 100%
|-
| colspan="5" style="background-color:#E9E9E9;"|
|- style="font-weight:bold"
| colspan="4" |Source:
|
|}

1999

|-
! colspan=2 style="background-color:#E9E9E9;text-align:left;vertical-align:top;" |Candidate
! style="background-color:#E9E9E9;text-align:left;vertical-align:top;" |Party
! style="background-color:#E9E9E9;text-align:right;" |Votes
! style="background-color:#E9E9E9;text-align:right;" |%
|-
|style="background-color:"|
|align=left|Vladimir Katrenko
|align=left|Independent
|
|21.83%
|-
|style="background-color:"|
|align=left|Yury Malyshak
|align=left|Communist Party
|
|20.78%
|-
|style="background-color:"|
|align=left|Anatoly Dyakov
|align=left|Independent
|
|11.78%
|-
|style="background-color:"|
|align=left|Maria Ivanova
|align=left|Independent
|
|7.95%
|-
|style="background-color:#020266"|
|align=left|Natalya Bryntsalova
|align=left|Russian Socialist Party
|
|6.24%
|-
|style="background-color:"|
|align=left|Artemy Zakharenkov
|align=left|Yabloko
|
|5.74%
|-
|style="background-color:#C21022"|
|align=left|Ilya Iliadi
|align=left|Party of Pensioners
|
|4.67%
|-
|style="background-color:"|
|align=left|Sergey Galkin
|align=left|Independent
|
|4.01%
|-
|style="background-color:"|
|align=left|Sergey Kshov
|align=left|Liberal Democratic Party
|
|1.23%
|-
|style="background-color:#FCCA19"|
|align=left|Oleg Timofeyev
|align=left|Congress of Russian Communities-Yury Boldyrev Movement
|
|1.10%
|-
|style="background-color:#C62B55"|
|align=left|Roman Barbashov
|align=left|Peace, Labour, May
|
|1.07%
|-
|style="background-color:#FF4400"|
|align=left|Viktor Milenin
|align=left|Andrey Nikolayev and Svyatoslav Fyodorov Bloc
|
|0.90%
|-
|style="background-color:"|
|align=left|Nikolay Kurasov
|align=left|Independent
|
|0.78%
|-
|style="background-color:#000000"|
|colspan=2 |against all
|
|9.78%
|-
| colspan="5" style="background-color:#E9E9E9;"|
|- style="font-weight:bold"
| colspan="3" style="text-align:left;" | Total
| 
| 100%
|-
| colspan="5" style="background-color:#E9E9E9;"|
|- style="font-weight:bold"
| colspan="4" |Source:
|
|}

2003

|-
! colspan=2 style="background-color:#E9E9E9;text-align:left;vertical-align:top;" |Candidate
! style="background-color:#E9E9E9;text-align:left;vertical-align:top;" |Party
! style="background-color:#E9E9E9;text-align:right;" |Votes
! style="background-color:#E9E9E9;text-align:right;" |%
|-
|style="background-color:"|
|align=left|Vladimir Katrenko (incumbent)
|align=left|United Russia
|
|51.73%
|-
|style="background-color:"|
|align=left|Yury Malyshak
|align=left|Communist Party
|
|13.15%
|-
|style="background-color:"|
|align=left|Igor Golikov
|align=left|Liberal Democratic Party
|
|6.41%
|-
|style="background-color:#1042A5"|
|align=left|Vladimir Gevorkov
|align=left|Union of Right Forces
|
|4.14%
|-
|style="background-color:"|
|align=left|Oleg Taran
|align=left|Yabloko
|
|3.84%
|-
|style="background-color:#00A1FF"|
|align=left|Oleg Timofeyev
|align=left|Party of Russia's Rebirth-Russian Party of Life
|
|1.57%
|-
|style="background-color:#408080"|
|align=left|Sergey Sadovnikov
|align=left|For a Holy Russia
|
|1.43%
|-
|style="background-color:"|
|align=left|Yury Pechenov
|align=left|Independent
|
|1.22%
|-
|style="background-color:#164C8C"|
|align=left|Sergey Shcherbakov
|align=left|United Russian Party Rus'
|
|1.13%
|-
|style="background-color:#000000"|
|colspan=2 |against all
|
|13.53%
|-
| colspan="5" style="background-color:#E9E9E9;"|
|- style="font-weight:bold"
| colspan="3" style="text-align:left;" | Total
| 
| 100%
|-
| colspan="5" style="background-color:#E9E9E9;"|
|- style="font-weight:bold"
| colspan="4" |Source:
|
|}

2016

|-
! colspan=2 style="background-color:#E9E9E9;text-align:left;vertical-align:top;" |Candidate
! style="background-color:#E9E9E9;text-align:left;vertical-align:top;" |Party
! style="background-color:#E9E9E9;text-align:right;" |Votes
! style="background-color:#E9E9E9;text-align:right;" |%
|-
|style="background-color: " |
|align=left|Olga Kazakova
|align=left|United Russia
|
|52.80%
|-
|style="background-color:"|
|align=left|Aleksandr Sysoyev
|align=left|Liberal Democratic Party
|
|11.68%
|-
|style="background-color:"|
|align=left|Valery Smolyakov
|align=left|Communist Party
|
|10.08%
|-
|style="background-color:"|
|align=left|Kirill Kuzmin
|align=left|A Just Russia
|
|8.06%
|-
|style="background:"| 
|align=left|Marat Marshankulov
|align=left|Communists of Russia
|
|3.33%
|-
|style="background-color:"|
|align=left|Yevgeny Nikitin
|align=left|The Greens
|
|2.84%
|-
|style="background-color:"|
|align=left|Mikhail Serkov
|align=left|Rodina
|
|1.84%
|-
|style="background-color:"|
|align=left|Aleksey Kursish
|align=left|Yabloko
|
|1.79%
|-
|style="background-color: "|
|align=left|Andrey Petlitsyn
|align=left|Party of Growth
|
|1.44%
|-
| colspan="5" style="background-color:#E9E9E9;"|
|- style="font-weight:bold"
| colspan="3" style="text-align:left;" | Total
| 
| 100%
|-
| colspan="5" style="background-color:#E9E9E9;"|
|- style="font-weight:bold"
| colspan="4" |Source:
|
|}

2021

|-
! colspan=2 style="background-color:#E9E9E9;text-align:left;vertical-align:top;" |Candidate
! style="background-color:#E9E9E9;text-align:left;vertical-align:top;" |Party
! style="background-color:#E9E9E9;text-align:right;" |Votes
! style="background-color:#E9E9E9;text-align:right;" |%
|-
|style="background-color: " |
|align=left|Olga Kazakova (incumbent)
|align=left|United Russia
|
|62.04%
|-
|style="background-color:"|
|align=left|Andrey Serdyukov
|align=left|Communist Party
|
|13.23%
|-
|style="background-color:"|
|align=left|Oleg Shpunt
|align=left|A Just Russia — For Truth
|
|4.99%
|-
|style="background:"| 
|align=left|Yelena Miloslavskaya
|align=left|Communists of Russia
|
|4.90%
|-
|style="background-color:"|
|align=left|Nadezhda Piltenko
|align=left|Liberal Democratic Party
|
|3.95%
|-
|style="background-color: " |
|align=left|Ilya Revo
|align=left|New People
|
|3.04%
|-
|style="background-color: "|
|align=left|Yury Mirzoyev
|align=left|Party of Pensioners
|
|2.88%
|-
|style="background-color: "|
|align=left|Natalya Govor
|align=left|Civic Platform
|
|1.81%
|-
| colspan="5" style="background-color:#E9E9E9;"|
|- style="font-weight:bold"
| colspan="3" style="text-align:left;" | Total
| 
| 100%
|-
| colspan="5" style="background-color:#E9E9E9;"|
|- style="font-weight:bold"
| colspan="4" |Source:
|
|}

Notes

References

Russian legislative constituencies
Politics of Stavropol Krai